Aaron Gibson (born September 27, 1977) is a former American football offensive tackle in the National Football League (NFL) for the Detroit Lions, Dallas Cowboys and Chicago Bears. He also was a member of the Austin Wranglers and Cleveland Gladiators of the Arena Football League (AFL). He played college football at the University of Wisconsin.

Early years
Gibson attended Decatur Central High School, where he lettered in football and track. He holds the record for heaviest NFL player ever, at 410 lbs, weighing over 440 lbs in high school.

He was a two-way player. As a senior, he was a first-team All-state selection and was named as a Top 33 Pick by the Bloomington Herald-Times. As a defensive tackle, he had 8 fumble recoveries and 11 passes defensed.

College career
Gibson accepted a football scholarship from the University of Wisconsin. He didn't play in his freshman year because of failing to meet the requirements of Proposition 48. The next year, he was a reserve right tackle behind All-American Jerry Wunsch and was used primarily as a blocking tight end, after making his debut in the fifth game against Ohio State University.

As a junior in 1997, he became the starter at right tackle. He spent two seasons blocking for Heisman Trophy winner Ron Dayne, who set the NCAA Division I career rushing
record (6,397yards) in 1999.

As a senior in 1998, Gibson was recognized as a consensus first-team All-American, after having been named to the first-teams of the Football Writers Association, American Football Coaches Association, and the Football News and the Walter Camp Foundation. He was also a unanimous first-team All-Big Ten Conference selection. He was the first player in school history to be named a finalist for the Lombardi Award and Outland Trophy awards.

Professional career

Pre-draft
In the 1999 NFL Scouting Combine, Gibson ran the 40-yard dash in 5.3 seconds. He was described as "a proto-type right tackle in the NFL," for having "a huge body with big legs and a gigantic chest".

Detroit Lions
Gibson was selected by the Detroit Lions with the 27th overall pick in the 1999 National Football League Draft. He was expected to be the starting right tackle as a rookie, but suffered a left shoulder injury in an April post-draft minicamp and was placed on the injured reserve list.

The following season, he started the first 10 games at right tackle, until suffering a right shoulder injury (torn posterior subluxation) and being placed on the injured reserve list on December 4. In 2001, he started five of the first six games of the season, before being waived on October 30.

Dallas Cowboys
On October 31, 2001, he was claimed off waivers by the Dallas Cowboys but played only in the season finale. Gibson was limited by a knee injury in training camp and eventually released on September 18, 2002.

Chicago Bears
On November 26, 2002, he was signed by the Chicago Bears as a free agent to replace an injured Marc Colombo. In 2003, he had his most consistent professional season, starting at right tackle in all sixteen games with the Bears, after Colombo was lost for the year when he was placed on the Physically Unable to Perform list. In 2004, he played four games (three starts) and was declared inactive in 10. It would be the last season in which he made an appearance in a regular season NFL game.

Buffalo Bills
On April 5, 2006, Gibson signed with the Buffalo Bills as a free agent. He was cut on August 28.

Austin Wranglers (AFL)
On January 24, 2007, he was signed by the Austin Wranglers of the Arena Football League. On April 4, he was placed on the injured reserve list. On May 5, he was activated. He played in eleven games and had 3 tackles for the season. On July 30, he was traded along with defensive lineman Rob Schroeder to the Utah Blaze in exchange for past considerations.

Utah Blaze (AFL)
On October 12, 2007, he was traded to the Dallas Desperados in exchange for offensive lineman Devin Wyman and future considerations.

Dallas Desperados (AFL)
On February 22, 2008, he was released by the Dallas Desperados of the Arena Football League, owned by Jerry Jones, who also owned the Dallas Cowboys, where Gibson had previously played.

Cleveland Gladiators (AFL)
On March 13, 2008, he was signed by the Cleveland Gladiators of the Arena Football League. On May 22, he was placed on the injured reserve list.

Bossier-Shreveport Battle Wings (AFL)
On March 22, 2010, he was assigned to the Bossier-Shreveport Battle Wings. On August 9, he was suspended by the team. He was not re-signed after the season.

References

External links
Gibson's loss is Bears' gain

1977 births
Living people
African-American players of American football
All-American college football players
American football offensive tackles
Austin Wranglers players
Bossier–Shreveport Battle Wings players
Buffalo Bills players
Chicago Bears players
Cleveland Gladiators players
Dallas Cowboys players
Detroit Lions players
Players of American football from Indianapolis
Wisconsin Badgers football players